Perrodin is a surname. Notable people with the surname include:

Elvis J. Perrodin (1956–2012), American jockey
Eric J. Perrodin (born 1959), American politician

Surnames of French origin